Ndam or N'Dam is a Cameroonian surname. Notable people with the surname include:

Adamou Ndam Njoya (born 1942), Cameroonian politician, lawyer, author, and professor 
Hassan Ndam (born 1998), Cameroonian football defender 
Hassan N'Dam N'Jikam (born 1984), Cameroonian-French professional boxer
Joseph Mbah Ndam, Cameroonian politician

Surnames of African origin